James Dean (7 April 1842 – 6 March 1869) was an English cricketer. Dean was a right-handed batsman. He was born at Petworth, Sussex.

Dean made his first-class debut for Sussex against the Marylebone Cricket Club at Lord's in 1862. He made eleven further first-class appearances for the county, the last of which came against Kent in 1866 at the Bat and Ball Ground, Gravesend, In his twelve first-class appearances, he scored 220 runs at an average of 12.22, with a high score of 39 not out. With the ball, he took a single wicket.

He died at Duncton, Sussex, on 6 March 1869. His brother, David, played first-class cricket, as did Jemmy Dean, his uncle.

References

External links
James Dean at ESPNcricinfo
James Dean at CricketArchive

1842 births
1869 deaths
People from Petworth
English cricketers
Sussex cricketers
People from Duncton